Fear the Walking Dead: Flight 462 is a 16-part web series based on the television series Fear the Walking Dead. The series premiered on October 4, 2015, on AMC's official website. It also aired as promos during The Walking Deads sixth season. The web series tells the story of a group of passengers aboard a commercial airplane during the earliest moments of the outbreak. Over the course of the series, the plane and the lives of its passengers are put in jeopardy once they discover an infected traveler. Two of its characters, Alex (Michelle Ang) and Jake (Brendan Meyer), are introduced in Fear the Walking Dead season two, episode three, "Ouroboros".

Cast

 Brendan Meyer as Jake Powell
 Michelle Ang as Alex (previously known as Charlie)
 Kathleen Gati as Deirdre
 Lisa Waltz as Suzanne
 Brett Rickaby as Marcus
 Kevin Sizemore as Anthony
 Sheila Shaw as Connie

Webisodes

Awards and nominations

References

External links 

 
 

2015 web series debuts
Flight 462
2010s American horror television series
Horror fiction web series
Post-apocalyptic television series
American horror fiction television series
American science fiction web series
Zombie web series